Abcodia is a company that focuses on biomarkers for cancer screening. Its aim is to discover biomarkers that can be used for the early detection of cancer.

Disease focus 
Abcodia's primary focus is the study of biomarkers for cancer.

Cancer screening 
On 18 September 2013 Abcodia announced that it had entered into an agreement for an exclusive license for the Risk of Ovarian Cancer Algorithm (ROCA), a test studied for screening of ovarian cancer. The use of this test is not recommended by the FDA as there is no evidence it is either safe or effective.

History 

Abcodia is a spin-out from University College London and was founded in 2010. UCL granted Abcodia the exclusive commercialisation rights to a serum collection created by clinical scientists at the Institute for Women's Health at UCL. The serum biobank was formed as part of the UK Collaborative Trial of Ovarian Cancer Screening UKCTOCS, which was led by Professor Ian Jacobs and Professor Usha Menon.

Awards
December 2012, Abcodia won four prizes at the UK Startup Awards 2012 annual awards: Angel or VC-backed Business of the Year, Innovative Business of the Year, and Business Woman of the Year for its CEO Dr Julie Barnes. It also won the overall NatWest Startups Business of the Year for its work in cancer screening.

References

External links
 Abcodia website

Biotechnology companies of the United Kingdom
Biotechnology companies established in 2010
2010 establishments in England